The Golden Gate Mosquito is an American ultralight aircraft that was produced by Golden Gate Aviation. The aircraft was supplied as a kit for amateur construction.

Design and development
It features a strut-braced or optionally cable-braced high-wing, a single-seat, open cockpit, tricycle landing gear and a single engine in tractor configuration.

The aircraft is made from aluminum tubing, with the flying surfaces covered in Dacron sailcloth. Its  span wing was available in a strut-braced or cable-braced configuration, the cable bracing giving better negative g performance. On the cable-braced version the ground wires are supported by an inverted "V" kingpost. The aircraft is rated for load limits of +10/-6 g. The pilot is accommodated on a seat within a semi-enclosed fiberglass pod that includes a windshield. The cruciform tail is mounted at the aft end of the same keel tube.

Specifications (Mosquito)

See also

References

1980s United States ultralight aircraft
Homebuilt aircraft
Single-engined tractor aircraft